Jovana Pašić (born 12 May 1992) is a Montenegrin basketball player.

Honours
Vojvodina
 National Cup of Serbia (1): 2014-15

Radivoj Korać
 First League of Serbia (1): 2015-16

External links
Profile at eurobasket.com

1992 births
Living people
Sportspeople from Cetinje
Montenegrin women's basketball players
Small forwards
Power forwards (basketball)
ŽKK Partizan players
ŽKK Vojvodina players
ŽKK Radivoj Korać players
Montenegrin expatriate basketball people in Romania
Montenegrin expatriate basketball people in Serbia